RK Kolubara is a Serbian handball club based in Lazarevac. They compete in the Serbian Handball Super B League.

History
The club was founded in 1960. They made their Serbian Handball Super League debut in its inaugural 2006–07 season. The club subsequently finished as runners-up twice in a row (2007–08 and 2008–09). They would win their first trophy by capturing the Serbian Cup in May 2009. In the next 2009–10 season, the club successfully defended the national cup and secured its first ever national championship. They also participated in the EHF Cup Winners' Cup (2009–10 and 2010–11), EHF Challenge Cup (2007–08 and 2011–12) and EHF Cup (2008–09).

Honours
Serbian League
 2009–10
Serbian Cup
 2008–09, 2009–10

Notable players
The list includes players who played for their respective national teams in any major international tournaments, such as the Olympic Games, World Championships and European Championships:
  Nenad Puljezević
  Golub Doknić
  Aleksandar Glendža
  Mladen Rakčević
  Šandor Hodik
  Nemanja Pribak
  Momir Ilić
  Nedeljko Jovanović

Head coaches
  Vladimir Dragićević
  Saša Vučeljić (2014–2015)
  Vladimir Dragićević (2016–present)

References

External links
  
 RK Kolubara – EHF competition record
 RK Kolubara at srbijasport.net 

Kolubara
Handball clubs established in 1960
1960 establishments in Yugoslavia
Sport in Lazarevac